Millbrook School is a private, coeducational preparatory boarding school located in Stanford, New York, United States.

History 

Millbrook School was founded in 1931 by Edward Pulling. Pulling was a graduate of both Princeton University and Cambridge University, and he taught at Groton School and Avon Old Farms as well as private schools in the United Kingdom. While at Avon, Pulling began to think of creating his own school. His philosophy for a school was heavily influenced by the traditional setting he experienced at Groton and in the UK, as well as the progressive ideology that Avon possessed. After searching for suitable grounds to house the school — including an offer from then Governor Franklin D. Roosevelt to build in Hyde Park, New York — Pulling and his wife decided on the Stephenson farm just five miles (8 km) outside Millbrook in nearby Stanford, New York.

After the purchase of the property, Pulling drafted his first board of trustees, which included Endicott Peabody Sr., who was headmaster at Groton, and Henry Harkness Flagler, who became the first President of the Board of Trustees. With the generous support of the Flagler family and Pulling's father-in-law Russell Leffingwell the campus increased from the original farm buildings to include much of the current campus infrastructure.

Environmental Stewardship 
Environmental Stewardship is one of the five core values of Millbrook School and the school has contributed in many ways with having Trevor Zoo on campus, building solar panels that will source and generate electricity for the entire campus, and building school's architecture with LEED certification.

Trevor Zoo 
Trevor Zoo is the only zoo in the United States that is located inside a high school. The founder of the zoo was Frank Trevor, the first biology teacher at the school. The zoo houses 180 exotic and indigenous animals representing 80 different species, 10 of them endangered. It is accredited by the AZA, the Associations of Zoos and Aquariums.  Millbrook students participate with care of the wildlife in the zoo. A curriculum called Zoo community service, mandatory for 9th graders, encourages students to engage in animal husbandry, diet preparation, and veterinary medicine.

Notable alumni 

 S. Holden Jaffe, singer-songwriter and record producer known as Del Water Gap, class of 2012
 Serena Altschul, journalist, class of 1989
 Francisco L. Borges, Connecticut State Treasurer, class of 1970
James L. Buckley, U.S. Senator and federal judge, class of 1939
 William F. Buckley, Jr., author and founder of The Tamarack and National Review, class of 1943
 Schuyler Chapin, Commissioner of Cultural Affairs for New York City, class of 1940
 Frederic C. Hamilton, businessman, class of 1945
 John Dawson, musician, associate of the Grateful Dead, co-founder of the New Riders of the Purple Sage, class of 1963
 Alistair Horne, author, class 1943
 Robert Wood Johnson IV, Chairman and CEO of Johnson & Johnson, owner of the New York Jets, and US Ambassador to the United Kingdom, class of 1965
 Nicholas Kazan, writer, producer, and director, class of 1963
 Robert F. Kennedy, Jr. - Environmental law attorney, class of 1972
 David Guy Levy, producer, class of 1999
 Thomas Lovejoy, Conservation biologist, former Director of the World Wildlife Fund, class of 1959
Will Rayman (born 1997), American-Israeli basketball player for Hapoel Haifa in the Israeli Basketball Premier League, class of 2015
 Whit Stillman, writer and director, known for 1990s comedies Metropolitan, Barcelona, and The Last Days of Disco, class of 1969
 Rachel Uchitel, nightclub manager, class of 1992
 Rufus Wainwright, musician, class of 1991

References

External links 

1931 establishments in New York (state)
Educational institutions established in 1931
Preparatory schools in New York (state)
Private high schools in Dutchess County, New York
Boarding schools in New York (state)